Interstate 277 (I-277) is a  connector route linking I-76 and I-77 in Akron, Ohio. It was completed in 1970 and shares its entire length with US Route 224 (US 224).

Route description

I-277 begins at an interchange with I-76. I-277 heads east toward I-77 as a six-lane highway. The Interstate turns toward the southeast and has an interchange with State Route 93 (SR 93). I-277 has one more interchange with South Main Street before it interchanges with I-77 and its designation ends. The freeway continues as US 224.

History

Exit list

References

External links

77-2
77-2 Ohio
2 (Ohio)
Transportation in Akron, Ohio
Transportation in Summit County, Ohio